Elin Alfhild Isabella Nordlund (1861–1941) was a Swedish-speaking Finnish painter. She was one of the artists who joined Victor Westerholm in the artists colony at Önningeby on the island of Åland. Examples of her work are in the permanent collection in the Önningeby Museum and have also been exhibited in the Turku Art Museum.

Because there is another Finnish painter named  born in 1855, Elin Alfhild Nordlund used her middle name Alfhild, signing her works E. A. N.

Gallery

References

External links

1861 births
1941 deaths
20th-century Finnish women artists
Swedish-speaking Finns
Finnish women painters